The 1982 GP Ouest-France was the 46th edition of the GP Ouest-France cycle race and was held on 30 August 1982. The race started and finished in Plouay. The race was won by Francis Castaing of the Peugeot team.

General classification

References

1982
1982 in road cycling
1982 in French sport
August 1982 sports events in Europe